Two ships of the Royal Navy have borne the name HMS Spence:

  was an 8-gun sloop launched in 1722 and broken up in 1730.
  was a 12-gun sloop launched in 1730 and sold in 1748.

See also
 

Royal Navy ship names